Robert James Goldthorpe (born 6 December 1950) is an English retired professional footballer who played in the Football League for Charlton Athletic, Brentford, Aldershot and Crystal Palace as a centre back.

Personal life 
During his spell with Hayes in 1977 and 1978, Goldthorpe lived in Upper Norwood and was a representative for an insurance company.

Career statistics

Honours 
Charlton Athletic

 Football League Third Division third-place promotion: 1974–75

References

1950 births
English footballers
English Football League players
Brentford F.C. players
Living people
People from Osterley
Footballers from Isleworth
Association football central defenders
Crystal Palace F.C. players
Charlton Athletic F.C. players
Bath City F.C. players
Aldershot F.C. players
Hayes F.C. players
Southern Football League players
Isthmian League players